Podolepis is a genus of flowering plants in the tribe Gnaphalieae within the family Asteraceae. It is endemic to Australia and can be found in every state.

Species
There are about 20 species.

 Podolepis arachnoidea (Hook.) Druce - cottony podolepis, clustered copper-wire daisy
 Podolepis aristata Benth.
 Podolepis auriculata DC.
 Podolepis canescens A.Cunn. ex DC. - grey podolepis, large copper-wire daisy
 Podolepis capillaris (Steetz) Diels - invisible plant
 Podolepis davisiana D.A.Cooke
 Podolepis decipiens Jeanes
 Podolepis ferruginea DC.
 Podolepis gardneri G.L.R.Davis
 Podolepis gracilis (Lehm.) Graham
 Podolepis hieracioides F.Muell. - long podolepis
 Podolepis jaceoides (Sims) Voss - showy copper-wire daisy, basalt podolepis
 Podolepis kendallii (F.Muell.) F.Muell.
 Podolepis lessonii (Cass.) Benth.
 Podolepis longipedata A.Cunn. ex DC. - tall copper-wire daisy
 Podolepis microcephala Benth.
 Podolepis monticola R.J.F.Hend.
 Podolepis muelleri (Sond.) G.L.R.Davis - small copper-wire daisy
 Podolepis neglecta G.L.R.Davis
 Podolepis nutans Steetz
 Podolepis robusta (Maiden & Betche) J.H.Willis - mountain lettuce
 Podolepis rugata Labill.
 Podolepis rugata var. littoralis G.L.R.Davis
 Podolepis rugata var. rugata Labill.
 Podolepis tepperi, (F.Muell.) D.A.Cooke – delicate copper-wire daisy or delicate podolepsis
 Podolepis sp. aff. robusta - high-plain podolepis

References

 
Asteraceae genera
Endemic flora of Australia
Taxa named by Jacques Labillardière